The New Haven Nighthawks were a professional ice hockey team that played in the American Hockey League from 1972 to 1992.  They had affiliations with the New York Islanders (1972–1973), Minnesota North Stars (1972–1977), New York Rangers (1977–1981 & 1984–1987), and Los Angeles Kings (1981–1991).  The team played their home games at New Haven Coliseum.

History
The Nighthawks were Calder Cup finalists four times: 1974–75, 1977–78, 1978–79 and a dramatic, unlikely playoff run in 1988–89 when they finished fourth in their division yet won two exciting playoff rounds before succumbing to the Adirondack Red Wings in the finals in five games.  Those same Red Wings would take the Hawks out again in their last post-season before becoming the ill-fated New Haven Senators in 1992–93.

Notable players for the Nighthawks include former New York Islanders greats Chico Resch, Bobby Nystrom; ex-Boston Bruins Willie O'Ree and Billy O'Dwyer; Tom Colley, the franchise's career leader in games (534), goals (204), assists (281) and points (485); career penalty minute leader (688) Al Tuer; ex-WHA star Bobby Sheehan, Cam Connor, Bernie Nicholls, Blaine Stoughton, Mike Rogers and Glenn Healy.  The team was notorious for a revolving door for personnel holding the AHL record for players used in a single season with 62 in 1986.  No player other than Colley played in as many as 300 games for the Nighthawks, while only two goaltenders played over 100 games. Ron Scott played in 153 games and Doug Soetaert played in 101.

The franchise was renamed the New Haven Senators for the 1992–93 season when they began an NHL affiliation with the Ottawa Senators.  The following season, the franchise moved to Prince Edward Island.  Today, it is known as the Belleville Senators.

The last Nighthawk to play in the National Hockey League was goaltender Byron Dafoe, who played seven games for the Nighthawks in its last season in 1992.  The last Nighthawk active at any level of professional hockey was Mario Chitarroni, who played for New Haven in the 1988-89 season, and was active in the Italian professional league in 2009.

Franchise and area history
The franchise became known as:
New Haven Senators (1992–1993)
Prince Edward Island Senators (1993–1996)
Binghamton Senators (2002–2017)
Belleville Senators (2017–present)
The market was subsequently home to:
Beast of New Haven (1997–1999)
New Haven Knights (UHL) (2000–2002).
Bridgeport Sound Tigers (2001–present)

Season-by-season results

Regular season

Playoffs
The Nighthawks were runners-up for the Calder Cup in 1974–75, 1977–78, 1978–79, & 1988–89.

See also
 Professional ice hockey in Connecticut

References

 
Defunct American Hockey League teams
Ice hockey clubs established in 1972
Ice hockey teams in Connecticut
Sports clubs disestablished in 1992
Minnesota North Stars minor league affiliates
New York Islanders minor league affiliates
Detroit Red Wings minor league affiliates
New York Rangers minor league affiliates
Colorado Rockies (NHL) minor league affiliates
Los Angeles Kings minor league affiliates
1972 establishments in Connecticut
1992 disestablishments in Connecticut